Manzinus is a lunar impact crater that is located in the southern region of the Moon's near side. It lies less than one crater diameter to the south-southwest of the crater Mutus, and to the northwest of Boguslawsky. The latter is a crater with nearly the same dimension and a comparable appearance to Manzinus.

The outer rim of Manzinus is worn, eroded, and somewhat irregular. The outer rim to the north-northeast is joined to the smaller Manzinus R, and the crest along that side is lower and forms a saddle. There is a cluster of small craters along the southern side that partly overlap each other, consisting of the craters D, E, G, and N listed in the table below. The heavily eroded satellite crater Manzinus A lies along the southeastern inner wall. Similarly the small crater Manzinus S lies along the northern inner wall, and the cup-shaped Manzinus J overlies the northwest rim.

The interior surface has been resurfaced in the past, and now forms a level, featureless plain that is marked only by a few tiny craterlets. The floor has the same albedo as the surrounding terrain.

Satellite craters 
By convention these features are identified on lunar maps by placing the letter on the side of the crater midpoint that is closest to Manzinus.

References 

 
 
 
 
 
 
 
 
 
 
 
 

Impact craters on the Moon